School District 23 may refer to:

 Prospect Heights School District 23, a school district located and served in Prospect Heights, Illinois
 School District 23 Central Okanagan, a school district that serves the Central Okanagan, which includes Kelowna, for which the school district's office is based in
 Target Range School District 23, a school district in Montana

See also:
 Central Okanagan School District No 23 v Renaud, a related Canada Supreme Court decision